Hammad al-Harrani or Abu al-Thana' Hammad ibn Hibat Allah ibn Hammad ibn al-Fudayl al-Harrani al-Hanbali was a Muslim scholar, poet, merchant and traveler who left his home town Harran to live in Alexandria under the reign of Salah al-Din al-Ayyubi. Both towns were dominated by Hanbali school. However, he came back to Harran and died there in 598 AH/1202 AD.  He is the author of a lost history of Harran  and compiled poems. 

There were many scholars who listened and reported hadiths from Hammad al-Harrani during his stay in Alexandria and after he returned to Harran; among them were Ibn al-Hajib (570-646 AH) and Ahmad al-Harrani.

See also 

 Hanbali

References 

Hanbalis
12th-century births
1202 deaths
Sunni Muslim scholars of Islam
Year of birth unknown
12th-century Muslim scholars of Islam
12th-century jurists
12th-century Arabic poets
12th-century Arab historians
People from Harran